Fumbling Towards Ecstasy is the third studio album by Canadian singer-songwriter Sarah McLachlan, released on 22 October 1993 in Canada, 15 February 1994 in the United States, 24 May 1994 in Japan, and 14 August 1994 in Australia. It was produced by Pierre Marchand in Montreal; McLachlan wrote most of the album while living in a small house near Marchand's studio.

The album was an immediate hit in Canada, where McLachlan was already an established star. Over the next two years, it became her breakthrough album internationally as well. However, in some countries, most notably the US, the album was a steady seller that stayed in the middle ranges of the pop charts for almost two years. As of November 2003, the album had sold 2.8 million copies in the US.

Some editions contain an album version of McLachlan's 1995 single used for The Brothers McMullen soundtrack, "I Will Remember You". The track's lyrics do not appear in the booklet, nor does the track's crediting information.

In 2000 it was voted number 200 in Colin Larkin's All Time Top 1000 Albums. In 2022, Pitchfork ranked it number 119 on its list of the "150 Best Albums of the 1990s".

On August 5, 2008, a three-disc 15th anniversary edition of the album was released. The set includes the original remastered album, The Freedom Sessions EP and a DVD that includes live performances, music videos and more. The album was released by Legacy Recordings.

Track listing

Personnel
Sarah McLachlan – vocals, acoustic and electric guitars, piano
Bill Dillon – acoustic and electric guitars, guitorgan, bass guitar, piano
Michel Dubeau – saxophone
Kharen Hill – photography
David Kershaw – Hammond organ
Pierre Marchand – bass guitar, piano, keyboards, fake Hammond B-3 organ, drum machine, percussion machine, Roland 808, shaker, found sound
Jerry Marotta – drums, percussion
Brian Minato – bass guitar
Guy Nadon – drums
Jane Scarpantoni – cello
Lou Shefano – drums
Ashwin Sood – drums, percussion

Charts

Weekly charts

Year-end charts

Certifications and sales

Release history

References

External links

 The Sarah McLachlan Fumbling: The Podcast Features Darryl DMC McDaniels, Bill Leeb, and Alan Light

1993 albums
2008 video albums
2008 compilation albums
Sarah McLachlan albums
Sarah McLachlan video albums
Arista Records albums
Arista Records compilation albums
Arista Records live albums
Arista Records video albums
Live video albums
Music video compilation albums
Nettwerk Records albums
Nettwerk Records compilation albums
Nettwerk Records live albums
Nettwerk Records video albums
Albums produced by Pierre Marchand
Albums recorded at Le Studio